
Gmina Jeziorzany is a rural gmina (administrative district) in Lubartów County, Lublin Voivodeship, in eastern Poland.

Villages
Gmina Jeziorzany contains the villages and settlements of Blizocin, Drewnik, Jeziorzany, Krępa, Przytoczno, Skarbiciesz, Stawik, Stoczek Kocki, Walentynów and Wola Blizocka.

Neighbouring gminas
Gmina Jeziorzany is bordered by the gminas of Adamów, Baranów, Kock, Michów, Serokomla and Ułęż.

References

Polish official population figures 2006

Jeziorzany
Lubartów County